Uvarovka is a rural locality (a village) in Karmyshevsky Selsoviet, Alsheyevsky District, Bashkortostan, Russia. The population was 110 as of 2010. There is 1 street.

Geography 
Uvarovka is located 12 km southwest of Rayevsky (the district's administrative centre) by road. Grigoryevka is the nearest rural locality.

References 

Rural localities in Alsheyevsky District